Espoir Football Club de Mutimbuzi or simply Espoir Mutimbuzi is a football (soccer) club from Burundi based in Mutimbuzi. Their home venue is 2,000 capacity Stade Municipal.

The team currently plays in Burundi Premier League the top level of Burundian football.

References

External links
 Soccerway
 

Football clubs in Burundi